Kyle Edward Finnegan (born September 4, 1991) is an American professional baseball pitcher for the Washington Nationals of Major League Baseball (MLB).

Amateur career
Finnegan attended Kingwood High School in Kingwood, Texas. He earned all-district first team honors while helping his team to a 27–7 mark as a senior and a district championship. Finnegan also played in the HABCA All-Star Game. Finnegan enrolled at Texas State University. As a freshman, he had a 1–0 win–loss record, a 6.97 earned run average (ERA), struck out four batters in 10 1/3 innings of work. He earned the victory in his lone start of the season against Prairie View A&M and pitched three scoreless innings of relief against McNeese State.

In his sophomore year, Finnegan appeared in 15 games, starting 14. He threw a career-high 8 innings twice, against UT Arlington and Texas A&M-Corpus Christi. He finished the year with a 3.28 ERA in 93 1/3 innings, limited opponents to just a .242 average, struck out 75 batters while walking just 26. He began the season 4–0, with wins in each of his first four starts. Finnegan fanned a season-high 12 opponents in 7 innings without allowing a run against Notre Dame. He allowed just two earned runs in 27 innings over his first four starts to begin the year. He threw a scoreless inning in his only relief appearance of the year, as part of an 8–4 win against TCU and struck out eight without walking any in 7 1/3 innings against Sam Houston State. Following his sophomore season at Texas State, Finnegan was invited to play in the Cape Cod Baseball League where he played for the Cotuit Kettleers, helping them to a regular season championship.

Professional career

Oakland Athletics 
The Oakland Athletics selected Finnegan in the sixth round (191st overall) of the 2013 MLB draft. Pitching for the Vermont Lake Monsters of the Class A-Short Season New York–Penn League, he had a 3–3 record and a 2.70 earned run average in 2013. Also in the same year, pitching for the Class A Beloit Snappers of the Midwest League, he had a 1–1 record and a 9.82 ERA. In 2014, pitching for Beloit, he had 7–9 record and a 3.69 earned run average and 55 strikeouts. Finnegan was later named the starting pitcher for the west team in the 2014 Midwest League All-Star Game, where he earned the win tossing one shutout inning. Receiving a promotion to the Midland RockHounds of the Double-A Texas League, he had a 0–1 record with an 11.81 earned run average. He spent the 2015 season with the Stockton Ports, going 9–9 with a 5. 44 ERA over 127 innings. He split the 2016 season between Stockton and Midland, going a combined 2–3 with a 2.54 ERA over 63.2 innings. He split the 2017 season between Midland and the Nashville Sounds, going a combined 2–4 with a 3.88 ERA over 59 innings. He split the 2018 season between the AZL Athletics, Midland, and Nashville, going 1–3 with a 4.84 ERA over 44.2 innings. He split the 2019 season between Midland and the Las Vegas Aviators, going a combined 3–2 with a 2.31 ERA over 50.2 innings. He was named a 2019 Texas League All-Star. He became a free agent following the 2019 season.

Washington Nationals 
On December 8, 2019, Finnegan signed a major league contract with the Washington Nationals. He made his major league debut on July 25, 2020 against the New York Yankees, allowing one hit and no runs in one inning of relief. Finnegan finished his rookie year with an ERA of 2.92 and 27 strikeouts in 25 appearances for the big league club. 

On May 5, 2021 in a game against the Atlanta Braves, Finnegan pitched the fifth immaculate inning in Nationals history, striking out Austin Riley, Dansby Swanson, and William Contreras on nine pitches. He finished the season with a 3.55 ERA, 68 strikeouts and 34 walks in 66 innings.

On January 13, 2023, Finnegan agreed to a one-year, $2.325 million contract with the Nationals, avoiding salary arbitration.

References

External links

Texas State Bobcats bio

1991 births
Living people
People from Kingwood, Texas
Baseball players from Texas
Major League Baseball pitchers
Washington Nationals players
Texas State Bobcats baseball players
Cotuit Kettleers players
Arizona League Athletics players
Vermont Lake Monsters players
Beloit Snappers players
Stockton Ports players
Midland RockHounds players
Nashville Sounds players
Naranjeros de Hermosillo players
American expatriate baseball players in Mexico
Las Vegas Aviators players
Águilas Cibaeñas players
American expatriate baseball players in the Dominican Republic
Alaska Goldpanners of Fairbanks players